HS Hydrae is a triple star system in the equatorial constellation of Hydra. The inner pair were an eclipsing binary during the period 1920 until 2019, with HS Hya being the variable star designation. With a base apparent visual magnitude of 8.08, HS Hya is too dim to be viewed with the naked eye. During the primary eclipse, the magnitude dropped to 8.61; the secondary eclipse lowered the magnitude to 8.55. Based on parallax measurements, the system is located at a distance of approximately 335 light years from the Sun.

This star was determined to be an Algol variable as part of a survey of bright southern stars by W. Strohmeierand and associates in 1965, demonstrating it is a binary system with an orbital inclination close to the line of sight from the Earth. D. M. Popper found an eclipse periodicity of 1.568024 days for the pair with a combined estimated class of F3–F4. A longer-term analysis of the system's radial velocities in 1997 showed a third member of the system is likely orbiting the inner pair. This is probably a small red dwarf with about half the mass of the Sun and an orbital period of ~190 days.

In 1997, observations with the Hipparcos satellite showed the depth of both eclipses was lower than they were 20 years earlier. In 2012, P. Zasche and A. Paschke showed that the inclination of the orbital plane for the inner pair had changed by 15° since its discovery. The third member of the system is causing the orbit of the inner pair to precess, resulting in a change of inclination of 7.8° over the same period. By 2022, the eclipses have come to an end, with the final observed events captured by the TESS space telescope in 2019. Examination of earlier data showed that the eclipses had begun in the early 1920s, and the system is predicted to resume eclipses in 2195.

The combined stellar classification of this system is F5V, matching an F-type main-sequence star. The inner pair form a detached binary system that show ellipsoidal variation due to tidal interaction. The primary member, designated component A, has 1.31 times the mass and 1.28 times the radius of the Sun. The marginally smaller secondary, component B, has 1.27 times the mass with 1.22 times the radius of the Sun. The unseen third member, component C, has about 56% of the Sun's mass.

References

Further reading

F-type main-sequence stars
M-type main-sequence stars
Algol variables
Triple star systems

Hydra (constellation)
BD-18 2927
090242
050966
Hydrae, HS